An adam's apple, or a laryngeal prominence, is a protrusion in the front of the throat, usually more noticeable in men than in women and children.

Adam's apple may also refer to:

Forbidden fruit
Adam's Apple (film), a 1928 British comedy film
Adam's Apple, a 1986 TV movie directed by James Frawley
Adam's Apples, a 2005 Danish film
Adam's Apple (album), a 1966 album by Wayne Shorter
Adam's Apple (horse), a British Thoroughbred racehorse
"Adam's Apple", a 1975 song by Aerosmith
Adams Apples, a Ghanaian film series, directed by Shirley Frimpong Manso
Adam's apple, a variety of lumia
"Adam's Apple", a 2017 song by KSI